Phyllaplysia is a genus of sea slugs, specifically sea hares, marine gastropod mollusks in the family Aplysiidae, the sea hares.

Some authors place this genus in a separate family, Dolabriferidae.

Species
Species within the genus Phyllaplysia include:
Phyllaplysia engeli Marcus, 1955
Distribution : tropical waters of the Atlantic Ocean.
Length : 5 mm
Phyllaplysia padinae Williams & Gosliner, 1973
Distribution : in bays and estuaries of the Gulf of California.
Length : 45 mm
Color : greenish with white spots
Phyllaplysia smaragda K.B. Clark, 1977 or Emerald Leaf Slug
Distribution : along Florida's Atlantic Coast
Description : feeds on algae growing on the seagrass Syringodium. Discovered in 1970 and not been seen since 1982. It is now reported extinct, even if it was never listed on the Endangered Species Act.
Phyllaplysia taylori Dall, 1900 Taylor's sea hare or eelgrass sea hare

References

External links 
 Photo of Taylor's Sea Hare

Aplysiidae